Jabari Jelani Holloway (born December 18, 1978) is a former American football tight end in the National Football League (NFL) for the New England Patriots and Houston Texans. He was drafted by the Patriots in the fourth round of the 2001 NFL Draft after playing college football at the University of Notre Dame. He started 17 of 26 games over his two-year career and finished with 15 receptions for 157 yards. He signed with the Washington Redskins before the 2004 season but was quickly released.

He is now a Project Manager for INEOS Olefins and Polymers out of Houston Texas.

References 

1978 births
Living people
American football tight ends
Houston Texans players
New England Patriots players
Notre Dame Fighting Irish football players
Players of American football from Atlanta
African-American players of American football
21st-century African-American sportspeople
20th-century African-American sportspeople